Fisnik is an Albanian male given name, which means "noble".  The name may refer to:

Fisnik Asllani (born 2002), German football player of Albanian origin
Fisnik Papuçi (born 1983), Kosovo Albanian football player
Fisnik Rugova (born 1989), Kosovo Albanian basketball player
Fisnik Zuka (born 1995), Macedonian-Albanian football player

References

Albanian masculine given names